Carter Henry Harrison I (1736  – 1793), also known as Carter Henry Harrison of Clifton, was a member of the Virginia House of Delegates. On April 22, 1776 at the courthouse in Cumberland County, Virginia, "the first explicit instructions in favor of independence adopted by a public meeting in any of the colonies" were drafted and submitted by Harrison.

Harrison was the son of Benjamin Harrison IV and grandson of Robert Carter I. Harrison married Susannah Randolph, the daughter of Isham Randolph and granddaughter of William Randolph, and had six children. His descendants include Carter Henry Harrison III, who was assassinated in 1893 while serving as the Mayor of Chicago.

His home, Clifton, was listed on the National Register of Historic Places in 1973.

Ancestry

See also
Harrison family of Virginia

References

1727 births
1793 deaths
Carter family of Virginia
Carter Henry, I
People from Virginia
Members of the Virginia House of Delegates
18th-century American politicians